The 1987–88 Iraq FA Cup was the 11th edition of the Iraq FA Cup as a clubs-only competition. The tournament was won by Al-Rasheed for the second consecutive time, beating Al-Zawraa 4–3 on penalties in the final after a 0–0 draw on 28 September 1987. Al-Rasheed won the 1987–88 Iraqi National League as well to complete their second double in a row. It was also Al-Zawraa's first FA Cup final defeat.

Matches

Final

References

External links
 Iraqi Football Website

Iraq FA Cup
Cup